This is a list of moths of the family Pterophoridae that are found in India. It also acts as an index to the species articles and forms part of the full List of moths of India.

Subfamily Pterophorinae
Amblyptilia forcipata (Zeller, 1867)
Buckleria paludum (Zeller, 1839)
Calyciphora sesamitis (Meyrick, 1905)
Cosmoclostis auxileuca (Meyrick, 1907)
Cosmoclostis leucomecola T. B. Fletcher, 1947
Cosmoclostis pesseuta Meyrick, 1906
Cosmoclostis premnicola T. B. Fletcher, 1932
Crombrugghia clarisignis (Meyrick, 1924)
Crombrugghia distans ( Zeller, 1847)
Diacrotricha fasciola (Zeller, 1851)
Emmelina argoteles (Meyrick, 1922)
Emmelina monodactyla (Linnaeus, 1758)
Exelastis atomosa (Walsingham, 1885)
Exelastis crepuscularis (Meyrick, 1910)
Exelastis phlyctaenias (Meyrick, 1911)
Exelastis pumilio (Zeller, 1873)
Gypsochares catharotes (Meyrick, 1907)
Gypsochares kukti Arenberger, 1989
Hellinsia aruna Arenberger, 1991
Hellinsia distinctus (Herrich-Schäffer, 1855)
Hellinsia fletcheri Arenberger, 1992
Hellinsia fuscomarginata Arenberger, 1991
Hellinsia lienigianus (Zeller, 1852)
Hellinsia pectodactyla (Staudinger, 1859)
Hellinsia shillongi Kovtunovich, 2003
Hellinsia siniaevi Kovtunovich, 2003
Hellinsia triadias (Meyrick, 1907)
Hellinsia umrani Kovtunovich, 2003
Intercapperia scindia Arenberger, 1988
Koremaguia alticola (C. Felder, R. Felder & Rogenhofer, 1875)
Koremaguia aurantidactyla Hampson, 1891
Lantanophaga anellatus Rose & Pooni, 2003
Lantanophaga pusillidactyla (Walker, 1864)
Megalorhipida congrualis (Walker, 1864)
Megalorhipida defectalis (Walker, 1864)
Megalorhipida gielisi Rose & Pooni, 2003
Megalorhipida paradefectalis Rose & Pooni, 2003
Merrifieldia caspia (Lederer, 1870)
Merrifieldia flavus (Arenberger, 1991)
Oidaematophorus harpactes (Meyrick, 1908)
Oidaematophorus hirosakianus (Matsumura, 1931)
Oidaematophorus parshuramus Rose & Pooni, 2003
Oidaematophorus procontias (Meyrick, 1908)
Oidaematophorus sematias (Meyrick, 1908)
Oidaematophorus triadias (Meyrick, 1908)
Oxyptilus causodes Meyrick, 1905
Oxyptilus chordites Meyrick, 1913
Oxyptilus epidectis Meyrick, 1907
Oxyptilus lactucae T. B. Fletcher, 1920
Oxyptilus regalis T. B. Fletcher, 1909
Oxyptilus regulus Meyrick, 1906
Platyptilia cacaliae T. B. Fletcher, 1920
Platyptilia citropleura Meyrick, 1907
Platyptilia dejecta Meyrick, 1932
Platyptilia direptalis (Walker, 1864)
Platyptilia duneraensis Rose & Pooni, 2003
Platyptilia euctimena Turner, 1913
Platyptilia exaltatus (Zeller, 1867)
Platyptilia gonodactylus (Denis & Schiffermüller, 1775)
Platyptilia ignifera Meyrick, 1908
Platyptilia isocrates Meyrick, 1924
Platyptilia molopias Meyrick, 1906
Platyptilia rhododactylus (Denis & Schiffermüller, 1775)
Platyptilia sedata Meyrick, 1932
Platyptilia superscandens T. B. Fletcher, 1940
Platyptilia triphracta Meyrick, 1932
Procapperia pelecyntes (Meyrick, 1907)
Procapperia orientalis Arenberger, 1988
Pselnophorus albitarsellus (Walsingham, 1900)
Pterophorus elaeopus (Meyrick, 1908)
Pterophorus lacteipennis (Walker, 1864)
Pterophorus leucodactylus ( Walker, 1864)
Pterophorus melanopodus (T. B. Fletcher, 1907)
Pterophorus nigropunctatus Arenberger, 1989
Pterophorus niveodactyla (Pagenstecher, 1900)
Pterophorus tinsuki Kovtunovich, 2003
Sphenarches anisodactylus (Walker, 1864)
Sphenarches zanclistes (Meyrick, 1905)
Stenodacma pyrrhodes (Meyrick, 1889)
Stenodacma wahlbergi (Zeller, 1851)
Stenoptilia caroli Arenberger, 1988
Stenoptilia petraea Meyrick, 1907
Stenoptilodes brachymorpha (Meyrick, 1888)
Stenoptilodes taprobanes (C. Felder, R. Felder & Rogenhofer, 1875)
Tetraschalis deltozela Meyrick, 1924
Tetraschalis ischnites Meyrick, 1907
Tetraschalis ochrias Meyrick, 1907
Tomotilus saitoi Yano, 1961
Trichoptilus archeodes Meyrick, 1913
Trichoptilus bidens Meyrick, 1930
Trichoptilus paludicola T. B. Fletcher, 1907
Trichoptilus pelias Meyrick, 1907
Trichoptilus xerodes Meyrick, 1886
Xyroptila caminites Meyrick, 1908
Xyroptila oenophanes Meyrick, 1908
Xyroptila predator Meyrick, 1910
Xyroptila soma Kovtunovich & Ustjuzhanin, 2006
Xyroptila tectonica Meyrick, 1914
Xyroptila vaughani T. B. Fletcher, 1909

Subfamily Deuterocopinae
Deuterocopus alopecodes Meyrick, 1911
Deuterocopus atrapex T. B. Fletcher, 1909
Deuterocopus dorites Meyrick, 1913
Deuterocopus fervens Meyrick, 1913
Deuterocopus planeta Meyrick, 1908
Deuterocopus ritsemae Walsingham, 1884
Deuterocopus socotranus Rebel, 1907

Subfamily Ochyroticinae
Ochyrotica connexiva (Walshingham, 1891)
Ochyrotica concursa (Walshingham, 1891)
Ochyrotica yanoi Arenberger, 1988

Subfamily Agdistinae
Agdistopis sinhala (T. B. Fletcher, 1909)

External links
A Check-List of Microlepidoptera of India (Part-I: Family Pterophoridae)
Arensberger, E. (2010). Stichprobenartige Untersuchungen der Fauna Thailands (Lepidoptera: Pterophoridae). Zeitschrift der Arbeitsgemeinschaft Österreich Entomologen (62):1-16.

 
India
M